Setra is a German bus brand of EvoBus GmbH, itself a wholly owned subsidiary of Daimler Truck AG.

The name "Setra" comes from "selbsttragend" (self-supporting). This refers to the integral nature of the construction of the vehicles back in the 1950s when competitor vehicles still featured a separate chassis and body (often manufactured by separate companies). It is also possible that, with an eye to export markets, the company was mindful that for non-German speakers, the name "Kässbohrer" is difficult to pronounce. Until 1995 the firm operated under the name Karl Kässbohrer Fahrzeugwerke GmbH, but in that year economic difficulties enforced its sale to Daimler-Benz AG (between 1998 and 2008 known, especially in the United States, by the name of its holding company Daimler Chrysler). Since 1995, Setra has been a brand of the Daimler subsidiary, EvoBus GmbH.

The North American distribution for Setra by Daimler was set to be partnered and taken over by Motor Coach Industries on April 25, 2012, as Daimler restructured its North American bus operations in 2013; this agreement lasted until the end of 2017 when the REV Group assumed distribution responsibilities. Daimler has again self-distributed Setra coaches in North America since January 2020, through its new subsidiary, Daimler Coaches North America, LLC, with service support from Daimler Truck North America.

History 

The first Setra coach, the Type S8, so called because it contained eight rows of seats, was introduced in April 1951 at the French Internationale Automobile-vouz. It featured a self-supporting body designed by Otto Kässbohrer, a concept now featured in most modern coaches and buses. Equally unusual at the time was the decision to locate the engine behind the rear axle; the rear-mounted engine configuration is another voux bus-Setra innovation which subsequently became mainstream. It simplified the production process and created a range of passenger-focused possibilities regarding the floor level in the passenger and driver/crew sections, and for high-floor layouts, flexible use of the underfloor area.

Models 

The maximum number of seat rows can be identified by the type designation. In the first Setra series, the number of seats was alone. In the second series (series 100), a 0 or 5 was affixed, and one of the numbers preceded in each of the following series (series 200, 300, and 400). Example: S 8 (= 8 seat rows), S 140 (= 14 seat rows), S 215 (= 15 seat rows), S 417 (= 17 seat rows), or S 319 UL (= 19 seat rows). The seats are reduced by comforter buildings or a certain star classification; The type designation is retained. Starting from the series 200, additions after the number indicated the equipment: current (series 400/500) are H for high-floor construction (no wheel arches in the passenger compartment), HD for high floor, HDH for an extra-high floor, DT for double-deck touring bus, MD for mid-height floor (a spinoff of the GT series), UL for interurban commuter buses and NF for low-floor buses. In the past, the Grand Tourisme (GT), HDS for double-deck, SL for city buses, and NR (low-floor Rational) were used for the first highway low-floor (200 series). Only a few types were given different designations, for example, the S 250 Special (a modified S 215 HD which was also offered as an entry-level model after the introduction of the 300 series) and the S 300 NC (a former low-floor city bus as a predecessor of the Mercedes-Benz Citaro).

The different models of the 200 series also bore the name designations with name suffixes, whereby the designation International (with the letter I appended to the type designation) for travel and combi-buses with simplified heating/ventilation was used. The term Communal and Regional were used for regular services, and Rational for travel combination models. The short-term offered club bus model based on the S 210 H deviated from the name Real. Air-conditioned high-floor buses were called Optimal, the double-deck S 216 HDS Royal and the double-deck S 228 DT Imperial. The export version of the 215 HDH for the US market (later on, the HDH model for the local market was based) was called Transcontinental. Some of these designations still existed with the introduction of the 300 series, as for the S 328 DT, at the latest with the introduction of the 400 series, these name additions with the division into MultiClass, ComfortClass and TopClass were abandoned. Additionally, the name Business has been produced in Turkey since 2013, with simpler equipment.

Current

Historic

Major incidents  

2018 Kazakhstan bus fire – On January 18, 2018, a fire occurred in the passenger compartment of a 1989 Setra bus in Kazakhstan, resulting in 52 casualties. The fire was due to an open-flame cooker being used onboard the vehicle, adjacent to fuel canisters being kept in the passenger compartment.

Also, on the ITV You've Been Framed special, "Top 100 Holidays", in the clip which placed at No. 2, a man who says, "Sadly, it is the end of our intrepid holiday", ironically nearly gets run over by a K-Setra minibus on a narrow, icy road, but it might have turned out that the video could have been staged because the shot cuts between two different vans.

Gallery

See also
Seida
Chavdar
Eagle Bus
Jetbus Adiputro
Adiputro Wirasejati
LP Jaya

References

Notes

Bibliography

External links

Setra website
SetraClassic (part of the Setra website): Setra History (archived version) – in English
Setra USA

Vehicle manufacturing companies established in 1951
Bus manufacturers of Germany
Daimler Truck
German brands
1951 establishments in West Germany
German companies established in 1951